Thescelosaurus (ancient Greek - (-) meaning "godlike", "marvellous", or "wondrous" and  "lizard") was a genus of small neornithischian dinosaur that appeared at the very end of the Late Cretaceous period in North America. It was a member of the last dinosaurian fauna before the Cretaceous–Paleogene extinction event around 66 million years ago. The preservation and completeness of many of its specimens indicate that it may have preferred to live near streams.

This bipedal neornithischian is known from several partial skeletons and skulls that indicate it grew to between 2.5 and 4.0 meters (8.2 to 13.1 ft) in length on average. It had sturdy hind limbs, small wide hands, and a head with an elongate pointed snout. The form of the teeth and jaws suggest a primarily herbivorous animal. This genus of dinosaur is regarded as a specialized neornithischian, traditionally described as a hypsilophodont, but more recently recognized as distinct from Hypsilophodon. Several species have been suggested for this genus. Three currently are recognized as valid: the type species T. neglectus, T. garbanii and T. assiniboiensis.

The genus attracted media attention in 2000, when a specimen unearthed in 1993 in South Dakota, United States, was interpreted as including a fossilized heart. There was much discussion over whether the remains were of a heart. Many scientists now doubt the identification of the object and the implications of such an identification.

Discovery, history, and species
 
The type specimen of Thescelosaurus (USNM 7757) was discovered in 1891 by paleontologists John Bell Hatcher and William H. Utterback, from beds of the late Maastrichtian-age Upper Cretaceous Lance Formation of Niobrara County (at the time part of Converse County), Wyoming, USA. The skeleton, however, remained in its shipping crates for years until Charles W. Gilmore of the Smithsonian Institution's National Museum of Natural History had it prepared and described it in a short paper in 1913, naming it T. neglectus (neglectus: "neglected"). At the time, he thought it was related to Camptosaurus. He provided a detailed monograph in 1915, describing the well-preserved skeleton. The type specimen was found largely in natural articulation and was missing only the head and neck, which were lost due to erosion. The name comes from the surprise Gilmore felt at finding such a good specimen that had been unattended to for so long.  He considered it to be a light, agile creature, and assigned it to the Hypsilophodontidae, a family of small bipedal dinosaurs.

Other remains of similar animals were found throughout the late 19th century and 20th century. Another well-preserved skeleton from the slightly older Horseshoe Canyon Formation, in Alberta, Canada, was named T. warreni by William Parks in 1926. This skeleton had notable differences from T. neglectus, and so Charles M. Sternberg placed it in a new genus, Parksosaurus, in 1937. Sternberg also named an additional species, T. edmontonensis, based on another articulated skeleton, this time including a partial skull (NMC 8537), and drew attention to the genus' heavy build and thick bones. Due to these differences from the regular light hypsilophodont build, he suggested that the genus warranted its own subfamily, Thescelosaurinae. T. edmontonensis has, since Peter Galton's 1974 review, generally been considered a more robust individual (possibly the opposite sex of the type individual) of T. neglectus. However, Boyd and colleagues found that they could not assign it to either of their valid species of Thescelosaurus and regarded the specimen as of uncertain placement within the genus. The other point of contention regarding T. edmontonensis is its ankle, which Galton claimed was damaged and misinterpreted, but which was regarded by William J. Morris (1976) as truly different from T. neglectus.

In his paper, Morris described a specimen (SDSM 7210) consisting of a partial skull with heavy ridges on the lower jaw and cheek, four partial vertebrae, and two finger bones as an unidentified species of Thescelosaurus, from the late Maastrichtian-age Hell Creek Formation of Harding County, South Dakota, USA. He drew attention to its premaxillary teeth and deeply inset toothline which he interpreted as supporting the presence of muscular cheeks. Morris also pointed out the outwardly flaring premaxilla (which would have given it a wide beak) and large palpebrals. This skull was recognized as an unnamed hypsilophodont for many years, until Galton made it the type specimen of new genus and species Bugenasaura infernalis ("large-cheeked lizard belonging to the lower regions", infernalis being a reference to the Hell Creek Formation). Morris also named a new possible species of Thescelosaurus for specimen LACM 33542: ?T. garbanii (with a question mark because he was uncertain that it belonged to the genus).  LACM 33542 comprised a large partial hindlimb ("a third larger than described specimens of T. neglectus and Parksosaurus or nearly twice as large as Hypsilophodon") including a foot, tarsus, shin bones, and partial thigh bone, along with five cervical (neck) and eleven dorsal (back) vertebrae, from the Hell Creek Formation of Garfield County, Montana, USA.  The specimen was discovered by amateur paleontologist Harley Garbani, hence the name. T. garbanii would have been about 4.5 meters (15 feet) long, greater than average specimens of T. neglectus. Aside from the size, Morris drew attention to the way the ankle was constructed, which he considered to be unique except in comparison with Thescelosaurus edmontonensis, which he regarded as a separate species. Because Morris believed that the ankles of T. garbanii compared favorably to those of T. edmontonensis, he tentatively assigned it to Thescelosaurus. However, the scientific literature has favored Galton's view that T. edmontonensis was not different from T. neglectus (see above). In the same paper that he described Bugenasaura, Galton demonstrated that the features Morris had thought connected T. garbanii and T. edmontonensis were the result of damage to the latter's ankle, so T. garbanii could also be considered distinct from Thescelosaurus. To better accommodate this species, Galton suggested that it belonged to his new genus Bugenasaura as B. garbanii, although he also noted that it could be belong to the similarly sized pachycephalosaurid Stygimoloch, or be part of a third, unknown dinosaur.
 
Clint Boyd and colleagues published a reassessment of Thescelosaurus, Bugenasaura, and Parksosaurus in 2009, using new cranial material as a starting point. They found that Parksosaurus was indeed distinct from Thescelosaurus, and that the skull of Bugenasaura infernalis was essentially the same as a skull found with a postcranial skeleton that matched Thescelosaurus. Because B. infernalis could not be differentiated from Thescelosaurus, they regarded the genus as a synonym of Thescelosaurus, the species as dubious, and SDSM 7210 as an example of T. sp. They found that LACM 33542, although fragmentary, was a specimen of Thescelosaurus, and agreed with Morris that the ankle structure was distinct, returning it to T. garbanii.  Finally, they noted that another specimen, RSM P.1225.1, differed from T. neglectus in some anatomical details, and may represent a new species. Thus, Thescelosaurus per Boyd et al. (2009) is represented by at least two, and possibly three valid species: type species T. neglectus, T. garbanii, and a possible unnamed species. In December 2011, RSM P.1225.1 was assigned to its own species, Thescelosaurus assiniboiensis. It was named by Caleb M. Brown, Clint A. Boyd and Anthony P. Russell and is known only from its holotype, a small, articulated and almost complete skeleton from the Frenchman Formation (late Maastrichtian stage) of Saskatchewan. In April 2022, it was reported that a specimen of Thescelosaurus was found at the Tanis fossil site, supposedly dating to the exact day of the K-Pg extinction, making it the first non-avian dinosaur fossil recovered from that date.

Description
 
Overall, the skeletal anatomy of this genus is well documented, and restorations have been published in several papers, including skeletal restorations and models. The skeleton is known well enough that a detailed reconstruction of the hip and hindlimb muscles has been made. The animal's size has been estimated in the 2.5–4.0 m range for length (8.2–13.1 ft) for various specimens, and a weight of 200–300 kilograms (450–660 pounds), with the large type specimen of T. garbanii estimated at 4–4.5 meters (13.1–14.8 feet) long. As discussed more fully under "Discovery, history, and species", it may have been sexually dimorphic, with one sex larger than the other. Juvenile remains are known from several locations, mostly based on teeth.

Thescelosaurus was a heavily built bipedal animal, probably herbivorous, but potentially not. There was a prominent ridge along the length of both maxillae (the tooth-bearing "cheek" bones), and a ridge on both dentaries (tooth-bearing bone of the lower jaw). The ridges and position of the teeth, deeply internal to the outside surface of the skull, are interpreted as evidence for muscular cheeks. Aside from the long narrow beak, the skull also had teeth in the premaxilla, or upper beak (a primitive trait among neornithischians). Long rod-like bones called palpebrals were present over the eyes, giving the animal heavy bony eyebrows. Its teeth were of two types: small pointed premaxillary teeth, and leaf-shaped cheek teeth. Six small teeth were present in both premaxillae, with a toothless section at the tip of the beak.

Thescelosaurs had short, broad, five-fingered hands, four-toed feet with hoof-like toe tips, and a long tail braced by ossified tendons from the middle to the tip, which would have reduced the flexibility of the tail. The rib cage was broad, giving it a wide back, and the limbs were robust. The animals may have been able to move on all fours, given its fairly long arms and wide hands, but this idea has not been widely discussed in the scientific literature, although it does appear in popular works. Charles M. Sternberg reconstructed it with the upper arm oriented almost perpendicular to the body, another idea that has gone by the wayside. As noted by Peter Galton, the upper arm bone of most ornithischians articulated with the shoulder by an articular surface that consisted of the entire end of the bone, instead of a distinct ball and socket as in mammals.  The orientation of the shoulder's articular surface also indicates a vertical and not horizontal upper arm in dinosaurs.

Large thin flat mineralized plates have been found next to the ribs' sides. Their function is unknown; they may have played a role in respiration. However, muscle scars or other indications of attachment have not been found for the plates, which argues against a respiratory function. Recent histological study of layered plates from a probable subadult indicates that they may have started as cartilage and became bone as the animal aged. Such plates are known from several other cerapodas.

For most of its history, the nature of this genus' integument, be it scales or something else, remained unknown. Charles Gilmore described patches of carbonized material near the shoulders as possible epidermis, with a "punctured" texture, but no regular pattern, while William J. Morris suggested that armor was present, in the form of small scutes he interpreted as located at least along the midline of the neck of one specimen. Scutes have not been found with other articulated specimens of Thescelosaurus, though, and Morris's scutes could be crocodilian in origin. In his 2022 documentary, Dinosaurs: The Final Day, Sir David Attenborough reported a Thescelosaurus specimen allegedly killed on the day of the K-Pg extinction, covered in skin impressions that included elongated scales over the legs. One of the paleontologists excavating it was quoted as speculating they had a camouflage function. In a follow-up interview, Paul Barrett has noted that this means Thescelosaurus was not feathered as hypothesized for other small neornithischians.

Classification

Thescelosaurus has generally been allied to Hypsilophodon and other small neornithischians as a hypsilophodontid, although recognized as being distinct among them for its robust build, unusual hindlimbs, and, more recently, its unusually long skull. Peter Galton in 1974 presented one twist to the classic arrangement, suggesting that because of its hindlimb structure and heavy build (not cursorial, or built for running, by his definition), it should be included in the Iguanodontidae. This has not been followed, with Morris arguing strongly against Galton's classification scheme. At any rate, Galton's Iguanodontidae was polyphyletic and not a natural group, and so would not be recognized under modern cladistic usage.

Although Hypsilophodontidae was interpreted as a natural group in the early 1990s, this hypothesis has fallen out of favor and Hypsilophodontidae has been found to be an unnatural family composed of a variety of animals more or less closely related to Iguanodontia (paraphyly), with various small clades of closely related taxa. "Hypsilophodontidae" and "hypsilophodont" are better understood as informal terms for an evolutionary grade, not a true clade. Thescelosaurus has been regarded as both very basal and very derived among the hypsilophodonts. One issue that has potentially interfered with classifying Thescelosaurus is that not all of the remains assigned to T. neglectus necessarily belong to it. Clint Boyd and colleagues found that while the clade Thescelosaurus included the genus Bugenasaura and the species that had been assigned to that genus, there were at least two and possibly three species within Thescelosaurus, and several specimens previously assigned to T. neglectus could not yet be assigned to a species within the genus. It appears to be closely related to Parksosaurus.

The dissolution of Hypsilophodontidae has been followed by the recognition of the distinct family Thescelosauridae. This area of the dinosaur family tree has historically been complicated by a lack of research, but papers by Clint Boyd and colleagues and Caleb Brown and colleagues have specifically addressed these dinosaurs. Boyd et al. (2009) and Brown et al. (2011) found North American "hypsilophodonts" of Cretaceous age to sort into two related clusters, one consisting of Orodromeus, Oryctodromeus, and Zephyrosaurus, and the other consisting of Parksosaurus and Thescelosaurus. Brown et al. (2013) recovered similar results, with the addition of the new genus Albertadromeus to the Orodromeus clade and several long-snouted Asian forms (previously described under Jeholosauridae) to the Thescelosaurus clade. They also formally defined Thescelosauridae (Thescelosaurus neglectus, Orodromeus makelai, their most recent common ancestor, and all descendants) and the smaller clades Orodrominae and Thescelosaurinae. The below cladogram is that of Brown et al..

Paleobiology
 
Thescelosaurus would have browsed in the first meter or so from the ground, feeding selectively, with food held in the mouth by cheeks while chewing. Thescelosaurus was probably slower than other hypsilophodonts, because of its heavier build and leg structure. Compared to them, it had unusual hindlimbs, because the upper leg was longer than the shin, the opposite of Hypsilophodon and running animals in general. One specimen is known to have had a bone pathology, with the long bones of the right foot fused at their tops, hindering swift movement. Examinations of the teeth of Thescelosaurus and comparisons with the contemporary pachycephalosaur Stegoceras suggest that Thescelosaurus was a selective feeder, while Stegoceras was a more indiscriminate feeder, allowing both animals to share the same environment without competing for food.

Supposed fossilized heart

In 2000, a skeleton of this genus (specimen NCSM 15728) informally known as "Willo", now on display at the North Carolina Museum of Natural Sciences, was described as including the remnants of a four-chambered heart and an aorta. It had been originally unearthed in 1993 in northwestern South Dakota. The authors had found the internal detail through computed tomography (CT) imagery. They suggested that the heart had been saponified (turned to grave wax) under airless burial conditions, and then changed to goethite, an iron mineral, by replacement of the original material. The authors interpreted the structure of the heart as indicating an elevated metabolic rate for Thescelosaurus, not reptilian cold-bloodedness.

Their conclusions have been disputed; soon after the initial description, other researchers published a paper where they asserted that the heart is really a concretion. As they noted, the anatomy given for the object is incorrect (for example, the "aorta" narrows coming into the "heart" and lacks arteries coming from it), it partially engulfs one of the ribs and has an internal structure of concentric layers in some places, and another concretion is preserved behind the right leg. The original authors defended their position; they agreed that it was a type of concretion, but one that had formed around and partially preserved the more muscular portions of the heart and aorta.
 
A study published in 2011 applied multiple lines of inquiry to the question of the object's identity, including more advanced CT scanning, histology, X-ray diffraction, X-ray photoelectron spectroscopy, and scanning electron microscopy. From these methods, the authors found the following: the object's internal structure does not include chambers but is made up of three unconnected areas of lower density material, and is not comparable to the structure of an ostrich's heart; the "walls" are composed of sedimentary minerals not known to be produced in biological systems, such as goethite, feldspar minerals, quartz, and gypsum, as well as some plant fragments; carbon, nitrogen, and phosphorus, chemical elements important to life, were lacking in their samples; and cardiac cellular structures were absent. There was one possible patch with animal cellular structures. The authors found their data supported identification as a concretion of sand from the burial environment, not the heart, with the possibility that isolated areas of tissues were preserved.

The question of how this find reflects metabolic rate and dinosaur internal anatomy is moot, though, regardless of the object's identity. Both modern crocodilians and birds, the closest living relatives of non-avian dinosaurs, have four-chambered hearts (albeit modified in crocodilians), so non-avian dinosaurs probably had them as well; the structure is not necessarily tied to metabolic rate.

Paleoecology

Temporal and geographic range

True Thescelosaurus remains are known definitely only from late Maastrichtian-age rocks, from Alberta (Scollard Formation) and Saskatchewan (Frenchman Formation), Canada, and Wyoming (Lance Formation), South Dakota (Hell Creek Formation), Montana (Hell Creek), and Colorado (Laramie Formation), USA. With the exception of birds, it was one of the last genera of dinosaurs, its remains being found as close as 3 meters to the boundary clay containing the iridium layer that closes the Cretaceous. The Laramie Formation is the oldest formation that Thescelosaurus is known from, and magnetostratigraphy suggests an age of 69-68 Ma for the Laramie Formation. There are reports of teeth from older, Campanian-age rocks, particularly from the Dinosaur Park Formation of Alberta, but these specimens are not from Thescelosaurus and are much more likely those of Orodromeus. More specimens are known than have been officially described for this genus, such as the Triebold specimen, which has been the source of several skeletal casts for museums.

When Galton revisited Thescelosaurus and Bugenasaura in 1999, he described the dentary tooth UCMP 46911 from the Upper Jurassic of Weymouth, England as cf. Bugenasaura. If it is indeed a tooth from a thescelosaur-like animal, this would significantly extend the stratigraphic range of the group.

Habitat

Conflicting reports have been made as to its preferred habitat; two papers suggest it preferred channels to floodplains, but another suggests it preferred the opposite. The possible preference for channels is based on the relative abundance of thescelosaur fossils in sandstones, representing channel environments, in comparison to mudstones, representing floodplain environments. No bonebeds or accumulations of multiple individuals have yet been reported. Dale Russell, in a popular work, noted that Thescelosaurus was the most common small herbivore in the Hell Creek Formation of the Fort Peck area. He described the environment of the time as a flat floodplain, with a relatively dry subtropical climate that supported a variety of plants ranging from angiosperm trees, to bald cypress, to ferns and ginkgos. Although most dinosaur skeletons from this area are incomplete, possibly due to the low preservation potential of forests, Thescelosaurus skeletons are much more complete, suggesting that this genus frequented stream channels. Thus when a Thescelosaurus died, it may have been in or near a river, making it easier to bury and preserve for later fossilization. Russell tentatively compared it to the capybaras and tapirs. 

Other dinosaurs that shared its time and place include the ceratopsids Triceratops and Torosaurus, hadrosaurid Edmontosaurus, ankylosaurid Ankylosaurus, pachycephalosaurian Pachycephalosaurus, and the theropods Ornithomimus, Troodon, and Tyrannosaurus. Thescelosaurus was also abundant in the Lance Formation. Toe bones from this genus are the most common finds after fossils of Triceratops and Edmontosaurus, and it may have been the most common dinosaur there in life, if the Lance Formation had a preservational bias against small animals.

References

External links

 Thescelosaurus in the Paleobiology Database.
 Willo, the Dinosaur with a Heart - The official site for "Willo", from the North Carolina Museum of Natural Sciences.

Fossils of Canada
Late Cretaceous dinosaurs of North America
Fossil taxa described in 1913
Taxa named by Charles W. Gilmore
Lance fauna
Hell Creek fauna
Scollard fauna
Paleontology in South Dakota
Paleontology in Wyoming
Paleontology in Alberta
Laramie Formation
Ornithischian genera